The 1918 Stanley Cup Finals was contested by the National Hockey League (NHL) champion Toronto and the Pacific Coast Hockey Association (PCHA) champion Vancouver Millionaires. In a series held entirely in Toronto, the Toronto team won the series by three games to two in the best-of-five game series to win the Stanley Cup. It was the first series contested by the new NHL and subsequently the first Stanley Cup win by the Toronto NHL franchise team.

Paths to the Finals

Prior to the 1917–18 season, the National Hockey Association (NHA) had suspended operations as the result of a power play to oust Toronto Blueshirts owner Eddie Livingstone. The remaining clubs then met in November 1917 to form the NHL, using the same constitution and playing rules of the NHA. The NHL took the NHA's place in competing for the Cup in a playoff series with the Pacific Coast Hockey Association.

The Toronto NHL players were assigned from the Toronto NHA franchise, and played for a 'temporary' Toronto NHL franchise, operated by the Toronto Arena owners. This is why it is often called the 'Arenas' although no hockey club with the official name "Arenas" existed until after the 1917–18 season. The team at the time used no nickname; it was often referred to at the time as the "Blueshirts", the nickname of the NHA franchise, as it was announced by the NHA that the franchise had been sold, although Eddie Livingstone had not agreed to this as he wanted to resume his franchise or be compensated under his terms.

Toronto won the second half of the split regular season, while the Montreal Canadiens won the first half. Toronto then won the NHL title by defeating the Canadiens in a two-game, total-goals series, 10–7.

Meanwhile, Vancouver finished the 1917–18 PCHA regular season in second place with a 9–9 record behind the 11–7 Seattle Metropolitans. However, Vancouver beat Seattle in that league's two-game, total-goals finals, 3–1, with a 1–0 game two victory.

Game summaries
As with the three previous NHA-PCHA Cup Final series, the series alternated between the NHL champion and the PCHA champion each year, while the differing rules for the leagues alternated each game. This meant that all of the games for the 1918 championship series were played at Toronto's Arena Gardens.

Two of the major differences between the two leagues' rules proved to be a major factor in the series. The PCHA allowed forward passing (adopted in the 1913–14 season) and played with seven players per side; the NHL did not adopt forward passing until the following season, and only played with six players. In every game, the winner was the one playing under its league's rules. The Torontos won Games 1 and 3 with victories of 5–3 and 6–3, and the Millionaires recorded 6–4 and 8–1 wins in Games 2 and 4. Because game five was played under NHL rules, it helped Toronto's Corbett Denneny to score the series winning goal in a 2–1 victory. The Torontos outscored the Millionaires by a combined total of 13–7 in the three games played under NHL rules. Conversely, Vancouver recorded a 14–5 margin in the games under PCHA rules.

Toronto goaltender Hap Holmes recorded a 4.20 goals-against average during the series, while Alf Skinner led Toronto with eight goals. Cyclone Taylor scored nine goals for Vancouver.

Player stats

Stanley Cup engraving
The 1918 Stanley Cup was presented by the trophy's trustee William Foran. The Arenas never did engrave their name on the Cup for their championship season. 

It was not until the trophy was redesigned in 1948 that the words "1918 Toronto Arenas" was put onto its then-new collar. 

The following Arenas players and staff were members of the Stanley Cup winning team.

1917–18 Toronto Arenas

References

Citations

Bibliography

See also
 1917–18 NHL season
 1917–18 PCHA season

Stanley Cup Finals
Stanley Cup
Stan
St
1918
March 1918 sports events
Ice hockey competitions in Toronto
1910s in Toronto
1918 in Ontario